Kenisha Bell is an American professional basketball player. Bell began her college career at Marquette University and then played for the University of Minnesota. Professionally she played briefly with the Minnesota Lynx.

Family and early years
Bell was born in Chicago, IL the daughter of Aishia Bell and Brian Townsend. She has nine brothers, three of whom play college basketball, and seven sisters. Her brother Brandon Bell ran track at Marquette University. She majored in communications at the University of Minnesota.

College career
After starting her college career with Marquette in 2014, Bell transferred to Minnesota the following season. After redshirting her first year, Bell spent three seasons with Minnesota and made one trip to the NCAA tournament in the 2017–18 season.

Marquette  and Minnesota statistics 
Source

Professional career
Bell was drafted by the Minnesota Lynx with the 30th pick in the 2019 WNBA Draft. She played two preseason games with the Lynx before being waived in end of May.

WNBA career statistics

Regular season

|-
| align="left" | 2019
| align="left" | Minnesota
| 3 || 0 || 3.7 || .000 || .000 || .000 || 0.3 || 0.3 || 0.0 || 0.0 || 0.3 || 0.0
|-
| align="left" | Career
| align="left" | 1 year, 1 team
| 3 || 0 || 3.7 || .000 || .000 || .000 || 0.3 || 0.3 || 0.0 || 0.0 || 0.3 || 0.0

Notes

External links
WNBA Player Profile
Minnesota Golden Gophers bio

1996 births
Living people
American women's basketball players
Basketball players from Minneapolis
Guards (basketball)
Marquette Golden Eagles women's basketball players
Minnesota Golden Gophers women's basketball players
Minnesota Lynx draft picks
Minnesota Lynx players